Alan Hunter may refer to:

Alan Hunter (VJ) (born 1957), video jockey on MTV from 1981 to 1987
Alan Hunter (author) (1922–2005), English author of crime fiction
Alan Hunter (soccer) (born 1964), Australian football (soccer) player
Alan Hunter (Australian rules footballer) (born 1944), Australian rules footballer for Footscray
Alan Hunter (athlete) (1913–2002), Scottish athlete
Alan Hunter (singer), New Zealand singer-songwriter 
Alan Hunter (astronomer) (1912–1995), English astronomer, Director of the Royal Greenwich Observatory

See also
Allan Hunter (disambiguation)
Al Hunter (disambiguation)